Sebastián Romero may refer to:

Sebastián Ariel Romero, Argentine footballer who plays for Banfield
Miguel Ángel Sebastián Romero, Argentine footballer who plays for Independiente Rivadavia